Luna Rossa Winery is an American winery in Deming, New Mexico. It owns New Mexico Vineyards, the largest vineyard in New Mexico.

Luna Rossa was founded by Paolo and Sylvia D'Andrea in June 2005.

See also

List of wineries in New Mexico
New Mexico wine

References

Further reading

External links

2005 establishments in New Mexico
Tourist attractions in Luna County, New Mexico
Wineries in New Mexico